Bishop Dunne Catholic School is a college preparatory middle and high school located in the Oak Cliff area of Dallas, Texas (U.S.). In 2004, it was awarded the National Blue Ribbon School Lighthouse Award in regards for its continued academic excellence and dedication to the students of southern Dallas. It is the only Catholic school with grades 6 through 12 to hold an exemplary accreditation rating from the Southern Association of Colleges and Schools (SACS)  and by the Texas Catholic Conference Education Department (TCCED).

Renovation 
In 2013, Bishop Dunne Catholic School received a $6 million grant from Bishop Kevin Farrell. The school has used this money to renovate infrastructure including electrical, cabling, and wiring upgrades; a completely new HVAC system; and a sprinkler system.

Classrooms have been renovated with technology teaching walls, LEEDS environmental and acoustical standards, and new ceilings and flooring. The front office areas have also been completed. The auditorium and chapel have been re-modeled.

The classrooms were completed to begin the 2013-2014 school year while the auditorium and chapel are being worked on during the school year.

Campus 

Bishop Dunne is designed in a three pillar format. These compose the four main hallways of the campus. Within the school are three courtyards, two of which have been dedicated. The Vincent Langbein Memorial Garden and the Father Tim Gollob Garden Sanctuary were named after previous employees for their support and investment of the school. These gardens, which have been xeriscaped to minimize the carbon footprint of the school, function as a teaching tool for biology classes, a place of solitude for reflection, and as a patio for lunch.

In the center of the campus is the Chapel where students may go to for monthly confession. Also, theology classes hold weekly rosaries, reflections on bible readings, and solemn prayer.

The gymnasium has undergone renovations within the recent years. The improvements include professional grade wood flooring, heating and air conditioning, and bleachers. In conjunction with these additions the Orender Field House was constructed. This added a dance room, an additional weight and training room, and a locker room.

On campus, there are three fields that are utilized by Bishop Dunne's sports teams. Directly behind the school is the Earl Hayes Stadium. This is where the football, soccer, and track and field teams have their games. Adjacent to the stadium is the Steve Macko Baseball Field and the softball field next to it.

State championships
Bishop Dunne has won state championships in the following sports:
Baseball: 1969, 1970, 1972
Boys Basketball: 1972, 1979
Girls Basketball: 1975
Cross Country: 1970, 1999, 2000, 2001
Football: 1984, 1988, 1990, 2014, 2018
Softball:  1984
Boys Track & Field: 1971, 1972, 1973, 1976, 1984, 1985, 1986, 1987, 1988, 1989, 1990, 1991, 1992, 1993, 1994, 1995
Girls Track & Field: 1975, 1977, 1984, 1985, 1986, 1987, 1988, 1989, 1993, 1996, 1997, 1999, 2000, 2001, 2002

Notable alumni 

 Mike Bacsik, Major League Baseball pitcher for the Texas Rangers and Minnesota Twins from 1975 to 1980
 Darrion Daniels, NFL player
 Roderick Lewis, NFL player
 Steve Macko, played for the Chicago Cubs from 1979–80 before being diagnosed with testicular cancer.
 Bobby Watkins, NFL player
 Brian Williams, NFL player, won Super Bowl XXXI with the Green Bay Packers.

Notes and references

Notes

References

External links 

 
 Catholic Schools of Dallas (a website of the Diocese of Dallas)

Private high schools in Dallas
Catholic secondary schools in Texas
Private middle schools in Texas
Educational institutions established in 1961
1961 establishments in Texas